Premier America Credit Union is a member-owned credit union headquartered in Chatsworth, CA. Founded in 1957, Premier America has over 115,000 members and more than $3.4 billion in assets.

Mergers and acquisitions
In 2008, Premier America Credit Union acquired Top Premium Finance Company, a California insurance premium finance company.

In 2012, Premier America Credit Union acquired Telesis Community Credit Union.

In 2014, Premier America merged with NBCU Employees Federal Credit Union.

In 2015, the credit union merged with Pacific Oaks Federal Credit Union.

Membership
 Los Angeles County, California
 Ventura County, California
 Santa Clarita Valley
 San Fernando Valley
 Harris County, Texas

Services provided
Premier America member-owners have access to their accounts through Online & Mobile Banking, Mobile Deposit, Zelle® (Person-to-Person Transfer), 30,000+ Free ATMs nationwide and 5,000+ Shared Branches Nationwide.

References

External links
 Premier America's official website

Credit unions based in California